Legislative elections were held in the Mid-West Region in Nigeria in February 1964. The result was a victory for the National Council of Nigerian Citizens, which won 53 of the 68 seats.

Results

References
The Europa World Year Book 1965, Volume II, p. 874

Regional elections in Nigeria
Nigeria
February 1964 events in Africa